Hecataeus is a large lunar impact crater that lies near the eastern limb of the Moon. It is attached to the northern rim of the walled plain Humboldt. To the northeast is the smaller crater Gibbs. East of Hecataeus is a chain of small craters forming a line radial to Humboldt; these are designated the Catena Humboldt, named after the walled plain.

Hecataeus is a worn and eroded walled plain with wide inner walls. Its northern part overlies half of Hecataeus K, a fairly substantial crater. Along the southern rim, the outer rampart of ejecta from Humboldt forms a rugged interior surface across the southern floor. Several small, bowl-shaped craters lay across the eastern rim and inner wall. The western rim is much less damaged by impacts, although it is still eroded. The northern part of the interior floor is relatively featureless.

Satellite craters
By convention these features are identified on lunar maps by placing the letter on the side of the crater midpoint that is closest to Hecataeus.

References

 
 
 
 
 
 
 
 
 
 
 
 

Impact craters on the Moon